Will Faust Nicholson (September 12, 1900 – January 1975) was an American politician who served as the mayor of Denver, Colorado from 1955 to 1959.

References

Mayors of Denver
1900 births
1975 deaths
20th-century American politicians
People from Aurora, Illinois